Buttelstedt is a former Verwaltungsgemeinschaft in the district Weimarer Land in Thuringia, Germany. The seat of the Verwaltungsgemeinschaft was in Buttelstedt. It was disbanded on 31 December 2013, when it was merged with the Verwaltungsgemeinschaft Berlstedt to form the new Verwaltungsgemeinschaft Nordkreis Weimar.

The Verwaltungsgemeinschaft Buttelstedt consisted of the following municipalities:

 Buttelstedt 
 Großobringen 
 Heichelheim 
 Kleinobringen 
 Leutenthal 
 Rohrbach 
 Sachsenhausen 
 Wohlsborn

Former Verwaltungsgemeinschaften in Thuringia